Benthofascis conorbioides is a species of sea snail, a marine gastropod mollusc in the family Conorbidae.

These snails are predatory and venomous. They are capable of "stinging" humans, therefore live ones should be handled carefully or not at all.

Description
The length of an adult shell varies between 38 and 43 mm, its diameter between 15 mm and 17 mm.

Distribution
This marine species is endemic to Australia and occurs off Southern Queensland at depths between 80 m and 120 m.

References

External links
 

conorbioides
Gastropods of Australia
Gastropods described in 2011